The Savannah Challenger (currently known as St. Joseph's/Candler Savannah Challenger for sponsorship reasons) is a professional tennis tournament played on outdoor green clay courts. It is currently part of the Association of Tennis Professionals (ATP) Challenger Tour. It is held annually at the Franklin Creek Sports Complex at The Landings Club in Savannah, Georgia, United States, since 2009.

Carsten Ball was the only one to win two doubles titles of the tournament.

Past finals

Singles

Doubles

External links
Official website
ITF search

 
ATP Challenger Tour
Clay court tennis tournaments
Tennis tournaments in the United States
Recurring sporting events established in 2009